The I.Ae. 22 DL was an Argentine advanced training aircraft designed by the Instituto Aerotecnico (AeroTechnical Institute) in 1943, with a wooden structure, which resembled the North American NA-16.

Development
The I.Ae. 22 DL was a development of the I.Ae. D.L. 21, which itself was itself developed from the North American NA-16, at that time in service with the Argentine military.

Argentine experience with the NA-16-4P and deteriorating political relations with the US led to the local development of the I.Ae. D.L. 21, which shared the NA-16 fuselage structure. However it proved too difficult to produce and an entirely new design (the I.Ae. D.L. 22) of similar configuration, but structurally different and optimized to available materials was built instead.

It had a wooden structure, and a nine-cylinder  I.Ae. 16 El Gaucho radial engine with a Hamilton Standard 2M-D-30 metallic propeller.

The prototype flew on 8 August 1944, although some sources give 14 May 1944. Approximately 200 aircraft were built.  A version with a  Armstrong Siddeley Cheetah 25 radial engine and a Rotol constant speed propeller was designated I.Ae. 22- C.

Operators
 
 Argentine Air Force
 Argentine Naval Aviation

Surviving aircraft

 A restored example, constructor number 728, is on display marked as Ea-701 at the Museo Nacional de Aeronáutica de Argentina.

Specifications (I.Ae.22 DL)

See also

Notes

Bibliography
 
 Burgos, Antonio C. "Los 75 años de la Fábrica Militar de Aviones"(in Spanish). aeroespacio.com. Retrieved: 15 October 2009. 
"Fabrica Militar de Aviones" (in Spanish). Aerospacio, Buenos Aires, 1977.  Article on the 50th anniversary of the "Fabrica Militar de Aviones" listing all the aircraft developed and manufactured there since 1927.

Further reading

External links

 Development and Specifications (in Spanish)

IAe022
1940s Argentine military trainer aircraft
Single-engined tractor aircraft
Low-wing aircraft
World War II military equipment of Argentina
Aircraft first flown in 1944